Io, is an uninhabited Greek islet, close to the coast of Lasithi, eastern Crete, and in the Libyan Sea. It is part of the Lefki municipality.

See also
List of islands of Greece

Landforms of Lasithi
Uninhabited islands of Crete
Islands of Greece